Patricia Kempner (born August 24, 1942) is an American former competition swimmer, Olympic champion, and former world record-holder in two events.

On April 27, 1957, she became the first woman to set an official world record in the 200-meter individual medley, clocking 2:48.2 at a swim meet in Chicago, Illinois.  The record would survive for over a year.

At the 1960 Summer Olympics in Rome, she won a gold medal by swimming the breaststroke leg for the first-place U.S. team in the women's 4×100-meter medley relay, together with teammates Lynn Burke (backstroke), Carolyn Schuler (butterfly), and Chris von Saltza (freestyle).  The U.S medley relay team set a new world record in the event final of 4:41.1.  Individually, she also competed in the women's 200-meter breaststroke, finishing seventh in the event final.

See also
 List of Olympic medalists in swimming (women)
 World record progression 200 metres individual medley
 World record progression 4 × 100 metres medley relay

References

External links
 

1942 births
Living people
American female breaststroke swimmers
American female medley swimmers
World record setters in swimming
Olympic gold medalists for the United States in swimming
Sportspeople from Augusta, Georgia
Swimmers at the 1960 Summer Olympics
Medalists at the 1960 Summer Olympics
21st-century American women
Pan American Games medalists in swimming
Pan American Games silver medalists for the United States
Swimmers at the 1959 Pan American Games
Medalists at the 1959 Pan American Games
20th-century American women